Terry Tate: Office Linebacker was a series of short comedy television commercials created by Rawson Marshall Thurber for Reebok based on a short film pilot Peter Chiarelli created in 2000; Tate was first shown at Super Bowl XXXVII in 2003. The short films feature Lester Speight as "Terrible" Terry Tate, an American football linebacker who "gives out the pain" to those in the office who are not obeying office policies.

Originally, Reebok produced six episodes between August to December 2002 with another episode Terry Tate, Office Linebacker: Sensitivity Training being made on February 1, 2004. Even Reebok in the United Kingdom made an episode called Late Lunch on January 22, 2005. There are a total of 9 episodes.  The advertising campaign was one of the most successful of those in the history of the Super Bowl halftime shows.

The catchphrases include "The pain train's comin'", "You kill the joe, you make some mo'", "You can't cut the cheese wherever you please!", "'Cause when it's game time, it's pain time!", "Don't bring that weak-ass stuff up in this humpy-bumpy" and "Woo-woo!" After tackling a worker, Terry usually leaves him with a "WOOH! Bitch!!!"

While the first episode of the series implies that hiring an office linebacker is a highly unorthodox practice (one described as "thinking outside the box"), future episodes depict office linebackers as a common occurrence.

Though successful in attracting viewers and attention, the ads' ability to increase recognition of the Reebok brand has been questioned, with only 55% of respondents on an on-line poll indicating they realized the ad was affiliated with the company.  Despite being aired only once on national television, the short was downloaded more than seven million times from Reebok's website.

Main characters
Lester Speight as "Terrible" Terry Tate (a.k.a. The Pain Train a.k.a. Triple T) - Hired by Felcher & Sons as an office linebacker. He enjoys his job, attacking his fellow office co-workers who are lazy or make mistakes of any kind. Terry is also in charge of office supplies; this is why all his interviews are done in the supply storage room which is his office.
Michael Sean McGuinness as Ron Felcher — The CEO of Felcher & Sons. Terry's employer. Felcher claims that since Terry joined the team, office productivity has risen 46%.
Jeremy Rowley as Paul Merkin — The Jr. Mail Room Engineer and a common target of Terry's wrath for offenses such as forgetting to make a new pot of coffee or farting in an elevator.
Natacha Wenger as Geneva Stoller — A sensitivity trainer, she works for Sanchez, Steamer & Co. and is employed by Felcher & Sons to help their own staff work better together, but made matters worse as she took Terry's position away and assigned him to a desk, causing office workers to take advantage of her and act like children. Things were back to normal after her departure (she sexually harassed one of Terry's co-workers, causing Terry to attack her).
Christopher M. Lee as Courtney Cate — Appearing in Draft Day, Courtney was chosen to work alongside Terry as another office linebacker.
Thomas Weaver as Gaston Du Coque — Hotel Manager; makes an appearance in Vacation, highlighting Terry Tate's impact on the employees.

Original episodes
Terry's World (August 11, 2002)
An introduction to Terry's world. He slams into office worker Paul Merkin after Paul finishes off the coffee without making more, and then Ron Felcher gives a brief description about how the productivity in the office has soared after Terry's arrival from Reebok. Terry then puts more office workers in their places, for various offenses such as Phillip for failing to recycle an aluminium can, Richard for failing to put a cover sheet on one of his TPS reports and later stealing a box of ballpoint pens from him, and a worker for drinking coffee while not on break. His friendly side is also shown, as on office worker Jim's birthday, Terry kindly presents him with a birthday cake. Near the end of the episode, Terry himself is the victim of an injury after being accidentally hit with a mail cart, but he returns to work swiftly in order to keep everyone in line once again.

Draft Day (September 1, 2002)
Felcher & Sons hire a new linebacker, Courtney Cate, to work alongside Terry in the office. At first, the two have some "initial friction" between each other, but they soon gel and begin to work more efficiently as a team, jointly dealing out the pain to the co-workers who step out of line. However, the company made the decision to reassign Courtney to the company's German branch, Felcher & Sons Europe, due to salary cap restrictions, and also because he made some mistakes (such as taking out office worker Timmy for wearing a Hawaiian shirt to work, finding out too late that it was Casual Friday). Ron Felcher then states that there is only one Terry Tate and that Felcher & Sons is lucky to have him. The episode then ends with Terry taking out office worker Phillip, for raiding the refrigerator and stealing someone else's slice of carrot cake.

Vacation (September 14, 2002)
After 1000 days at work without a single day off, state law requires that Terry must take a vacation. At first he dislikes his holiday (having problems opening his room's door with the card key, the small towels he is forced to use, and the TV set not working), but once he begins to put the hotel staff in line (as he does with his office co-workers), he begins to enjoy himself. The hotel's manager is pleased with Terry's actions, saying that he is welcome back any time and has been the best guest the hotel has ever had. However, back at Felcher & Sons, many of the staff have been taking advantage of Terry's vacation and acting childish without Terry around, but his return quickly gets the company back into shape again, with the end of the episode showing him slamming into office worker Gene for playing solitaire on his company computer instead of doing his work.

Office Athlete of the Century (October 15, 2002)
Terry is awarded the prestigious Office Athlete Of The Century award from OSPN (a parody of ESPN). Throughout the episode Terry's earlier life is recapped. He graduated from high school as captain of the football team before accepting a full scholarship to Major University. He then joined a freelance mime troupe. It was during this job that he attacked a rude spectator who was talking loudly on their cell phone and disturbing his performance. Ron Felcher, one of the spectators, saw this incident, and decided to hire Terry as a result.

Super Bowl 2003 commercial (November 27, 2002)
This is a remix of the incidents from the past episodes, depicting scenes from the past episodes.

Streaker (December 4, 2002)
In a direct spoof of a similar Nike ad, a naked man runs across the field during a soccer match. Terry appears from nowhere and slams him.

Sensitivity Training (February 1, 2004)
Office worker Paul Merkin accuses Terry Tate of assaulting him just for farting in an elevator, and in response Felcher & Sons hires Geneva Stoller, a sensitivity trainer. She gives out badges of shame to anyone who breaks office rules, and after Terry drives into a worker in his usual office role, she misinterprets this as an E11 situation, which prompts her to confiscate his jersey and demote him to a desk job. As a result, office productivity declines, and Terry is forced to watch from his desk as office staff all around him goof off and fail to do any work. However, after seeing Geneva make a sexual pass on male employee Pablo, Terry slams into her to put her back in line. After Ron Felcher hears about this, the company fires Geneva, and Ron Felcher shows how productivity had declined since her arrival, but since her departure things had recovered once again, with the help of Terry. The episode ends with Terry, back in his usual role, blitzing office worker Roger, who spent most of the episode using the speaker phone to joke obnoxiously with a friend (and whom he was unable to slam without permission during Geneva's time in the company). 

Late Lunch (January 22, 2005)
A short episode showing how Terry tackles a worker, Roger, who returns to his desk late for work. His co-workers are less than happy, handing him papers that should have been completed 15 minutes ago. But Terry is at hand to get the worker back in line once again.

Other appearances

Spoof of Nike ad
In February 2003, Reebok released a commercial featuring Tate that parodies a Nike, Inc. commercial. In the Nike version, a streaker disrupts a British football  match; in the Reebok ad, Tate tackles the streaker then proclaims, "You just did it, so I had to hit it".  The advertisement was one of several competitive and deliberate spoofs between the rival companies.

California recall election
In 2003, Terry Tate tried to run for governor in the 2003 California recall election, under the name "Lester Terry Tate Speight," but he did not gather enough signatures to qualify for the ballot.

2008 U.S. presidential election
The Terry Tate character resurfaced in a series of short videos urging people to vote on November 4, including scenes that depict the Republican vice-presidential candidate Sarah Palin being (purportedly) tackled following famously controversial interviews.

Episodes
 "From Russia with Love" (October 16, 2008), Tate tackles Palin after she answers a question from Katie Couric about her foreign policy experience. 
 "Reading Is Fundamental" (October 16, 2008), Tate tackles Palin after she gives an elusive answer to a question from Katie Couric about her reading materiall
 "Get Out the Vote" (October 20, 2008), Tate tackles a co-worker who states he will not be voting.

ESPN's Mayne Street
In a 2008 episode of Kenny Mayne's ESPN parody program Mayne Street, Tate appears to defend anchor Stuart Scott from an intrusion on his lunch break by an individual touring ESPN headquarters. Tate then reminds Mayne that people on his tour groups should not bother "the franchise" (Scott), and that this was discussed in a previous staff meeting.

2016 U.S. presidential election
During the 2016 U.S. presidential election, Funny or Die produced an altered version of the 2005 video of Donald Trump's lewd remarks to Billy Bush about women that had surfaced during the campaign. In the video, Terry Tate tackles a body double actor portraying Trump in response to Trump's remarks and tells Trump that's how he makes America great. He then turns to Bush and tells him he's fired.

2022 Hellmann's Super Bowl ad
This was a crossover commercial with Jerod Mayo and Terry Tate working the Hellmann's company customer phone support line.

References

External links
Terry Tate's Facebook Page

American football mass media
Internet memes
American television commercials
2000s television commercials
Viral videos
Workplace comedies